Andreas Görlitz (born 31 January 1982) is a German former professional footballer who played as a right-back.

Club career
Born in Weilheim in Oberbayern, Bavaria, West Germany, Görlitz began his professional career as a midfielder with TSV 1860 Munich, by then in the Bundesliga; his first match came on 10 February 2002, in a 2–1 loss at 1. FC Nürnberg, but he could only amass a further four league games in his first two seasons combined.

In the 2003–04 season, Görlitz made the transition to defender, and appeared in 32 matches for TSV, scoring his first professional goal on 27 March 2004, at Eintracht Frankfurt, through a header (3–0 triumph), as his side was finally relegated, after ranking 17th.

Görlitz signed with TSV neighbours FC Bayern Munich in the 2004 summer. He even started some matches in the new season but, following an injury in a UEFA Champions League contest against Juventus FC, on 3 November, spent almost two years in the sidelines.

In the summer of 2007, it was announced that Görlitz would join newly promoted Karlsruher SC, on loan for the 2007–08 season. The player only missed three league matches and his club finished 11th, well clear from relegation.

On 9 May 2008, the loan deal was extended for another season. Following his second year, in which he featured significantly less, also suffering another relegation, Görlitz returned to Bayern, to play through the final year in his contract. For the third consecutive season at the club, he was often demoted to the reserve squad.

On 4 March 2014, Görlitz signed a contract with the San Jose Earthquakes of Major League Soccer. After an injury limited his season to three league matches, Görlitz was released by San Jose at the end of their 2014 season.

International career
Shortly after signing for Bayern, Görlitz made his debut for the Germany national team, appearing in the last five minutes of the 1–1 friendly with Brazil, on 8 September 2004; the following month, he assisted veteran Thomas Brdarić as the striker closed the score at 2–0, in another exhibition game, this time against Iran. These two caps within a month were his only appearances in the German elite squad until the end of his career.

Career statistics

Honours
Bayern Munich
 Bundesliga: 2004–05, 2005–06, 2009–10
 DFB-Pokal: 2004–05, 2005–06, 2009–10
UEFA Champions League runner-up: 2009–10

References

External links
 
  
 
 

1982 births
Living people
Footballers from Bavaria
German footballers
Association football defenders
TSV 1860 Munich II players
TSV 1860 Munich players
FC Bayern Munich footballers
FC Bayern Munich II players
Karlsruher SC players
FC Ingolstadt 04 players
FC Ingolstadt 04 II players
San Jose Earthquakes players
Regionalliga players
Bundesliga players
2. Bundesliga players
3. Liga players
Major League Soccer players
Germany under-21 international footballers
Germany international footballers
German expatriate footballers
German expatriate sportspeople in the United States
Expatriate soccer players in the United States